The Esuvii (or Esubii; Gaulish: Esuuii) were a Gallic tribe dwelling between the lower Seine and the Loire rivers, in what is now Normandy, during the Iron Age.

Name 
Their tribal name appears to be related to the theonym Esus.

Geography 
The Esuvii lived at the time of the Gallic Wars (58–50 BC) around the present-day town of Sées (Orne), between the Coriosolites and the Aulerci.

References

Bibliography

See also
List of Gaulish tribes

Historical Celtic peoples
Gauls
History of Normandy